Marie Vieux-Chauvet (born Marie Vieux; September 16, 1916 – June 19, 1973), was a Haitian novelist, poet and playwright. Born and educated in Port-au-Prince, she is most famous for the novels Fille d'Haïti (1954), La Danse sur le volcan (1957), Fonds des nègres (1960), and Amour, colère et folie (1968). During her lifetime, she published under the name Marie Chauvet.

Family history
Marie Vieux-Chauvet was born in Port-au-Prince, Haiti, on September 16, 1916, to Constant Vieux, a Haitian politician, and his wife Delia Nones, a woman originally from the Virgin Islands.  Marie completed her studies at the l'Annexe de l'École Normale d'Institutrices and obtained a degree in elementary education in 1933. She married Aymon Charlier, a doctor, then divorced him. She later married Pierre Chauvet, a travel agent.

Work
Vieux-Chauvet's works focus on class, color, race, gender, family structure and the upheaval of Haitian political, economic and social society during the United States occupation of Haiti and dictatorship of François Duvalier. Although she lived under heavy surveillance during Duvalier's dictatorship, Vieux-Chauvet persisted as a writer, hosting meetings of the Les Araignées du Soir (Evening Spiders), a group of poets and writers of which she was the only female.

Vieux-Chauvet sent a trilogy of novellas to France to be published as a single book titled Amour, colère et folie (Love, Anger, Madness). Amour, colère et folie was published in 1968 by the prestigious publishing house Gallimard in Paris with the support of Simone de Beauvoir. The book was perceived as an attack on the Haitian dictator François Duvalier. Fearing the dictator's legions of Tonton Macoutes, she moved to New York City. Her husband, Pierre Chauvet, travelled to Haiti and bought all the copies of the book he could find. Vieux-Chauvet's daughters bought the remaining copies from Gallimard a few years later. She later remarried and worked as a housekeeper in Queens.

She died of brain cancer in the United States on June 19, 1973.

Extracts from her work appear in the anthologies Her True-True Name and Daughters of Africa. An English translation of Amour, colère et folie (Love, Anger, Madness) by Rose-Myriam Réjouis and Val Vinokur was published in 2009 with an introduction by Haitian-American writer Edwige Danticat.

Literary awards
1954 Prix de l'Alliance Française for Fille d'Haïti
1960 Prix France-Antilles for Fonds des nègres
1986 Prix Deschamps (posthumous), for Amour, colère et folie

Bibliography

Novels
Fille d'Haïti (Paris: Fasquelle, 1954; Paris: Zellige, 2014)
La Danse sur le volcan (Paris: Plon, 1957; Paris/Léchelle: Maisonneuve & Larose / Emina Soleil, 2004 (reprint with a preface by Catherine Hermary-Vieille); Léchelle: Zellige, 2008, 2009)
Trans. Salvator Attanasio as Dance on the Volcano (New York: William Sloane Associates, 1959)
Trans. Kaiama L. Glover as Dance on the Volcano (Archipelago Books, 2016)
Fonds des nègres (Port-au-Prince: Henri Deschamps, 1960)
Amour, colère et folie (Paris: Gallimard, 1968; Paris/Léchelle: Maisonneuve & Larose / Emina Soleil, 2005; Léchelle: Zellige, 2007, 2011; Paris: Zulma, 2015)
Trans. Rose-Myriam Rejouis and Val Vinokur as Love, Anger, Madness: A Haitian Trilogy (Modern Library, 2009)
Les Rapaces (Port-au-Prince: Deschamps, 1986). Published posthumously under the name Marie Vieux.

Plays
La Légende des Fleurs (Port-au-Prince: Henri Deschamps, 1947; Port-au-Prince: Éditions Marie Vieux, 2009). Published under the pen name Colibri.
Samba (produced around 1948 in Port-au-Prince. Unpublished)
Amour, Colère et Folie (adapted by José Pliya, Paris: Avant-Scène Théâtre, 2008). Amour was produced by Vincent Goethals, with Magali Comeau-Denis (Claire) and Cyril Viallon (dancer) and performed at L'Artchipel in Guadeloupe in 2008; Colère was produced by François Rancillac, with Nicole Dogué (Laura), at L'Artchipel in October 2008; Folie was produced by José Exélis in October 2009 at L'Artchipel.

Short story
 'Ti-Moune nan Bois (Optique 7. September 1954: 57-60)

References

Further reading
Chancy, Myriam. Framing Silence: Revolutionary Novels by Haitian Women. New Brunswick: Rutgers University Press, 1997.
Dalleo, Raphael. Caribbean Literature and the Public Sphere: From the Plantation to the Postcolonial. Charlottesville: University of Virginia Press, 2011.
Dash, Michael. The Other America: Caribbean Literature in a New World Context. Charlottesville: University of Virginia Press, 1998.
Dayan, Joan. Haiti, History and the Gods. Berkeley: University of California, 1998.
Maximilien Laroche Trois études sur Folie de Marie Chauvet, Collection Essais, Québec, GRELCA. 1984

See also
 Caribbean literature

1916 births
1973 deaths
Haitian women novelists
People from Port-au-Prince
Haitian women dramatists and playwrights
20th-century Haitian dramatists and playwrights
20th-century Haitian women writers
20th-century Haitian novelists
Deaths from brain cancer in the United States
Haitian emigrants to the United States